Basden is a surname. Notable people with the surname include:

 Richard Basden (born 1967), former Bermudian cricketer.
 Tom Basden (born 1980), English actor.
 Eddie Basden (born 1983), American professional basketball player.
 George Basden (1873–1944), archdeacon of The Niger.
 Dwight Basden (born 1972), Bermudian cricketer.
 A. E. Basden (died 1948), British philatelist.